Ahura Mazda, also known as Oromasdes, Ohrmazd, Ahuramazda, Hoormazd, Hormazd, Hormaz and Hurmuz, is the creator deity in Zoroastrianism. He is the first and most frequently invoked spirit in the Yasna. The literal meaning of the word Ahura is "lord", and that of Mazda is "wisdom".

The first notable invocation of Ahura Mazda occurred during the Achaemenid period with the Behistun Inscription of Darius the Great. Until the reign of Artaxerxes II, Ahura Mazda was worshipped and invoked alone in all extant royal inscriptions. With Artaxerxes II, Ahura Mazda was gathered in a triad with Mithra and Anahita. In the Achaemenid period, there are no known representations of Ahura Mazda at the royal court other than the custom for every emperor to have an empty chariot drawn by white horses to invite Ahura Mazda to accompany the Persian army on battles. Images of Ahura Mazda, however, were present from the 5th century BC but were stopped and replaced with stone-carved figures in the Sassanid period and later removed altogether through an iconoclastic movement supported by the Sassanid dynasty.

Nomenclature
'Ahura' is cognate with the Vedic word 'asura', both meaning 'lord'. The most likely etymology is from Proto-Indo-European *h₂ḿ̥suros, from *h₂ems- (“to engender, beget”), and therefore it is cognate with Proto-Germanic *ansuz. However, Finnish Indologist Asko Parpola traces the etymological root of Asura to *asera- of Uralic languages, where it means 'lord, prince'.

'Mazda', or rather the Avestan stem-form Mazdā-, nominative Mazdå, reflects Proto-Iranian *mazdáH (a feminine noun). It is generally taken to be the proper name of the spirit, and like its Vedic cognate medhā́, means "intelligence" or "wisdom". Both the Avestan and Sanskrit words reflect Proto-Indo-Iranian *mazdʰáH, from Proto-Indo-European , literally meaning "placing one's mind", hence "wise".

The name was rendered as Ahuramazda (Old Persian) during the Achaemenid era, Hormazd during the Parthian era, and Ohrmazd was used during the Sassanian era.

The name may be attested on cuneiform tablets of Assyrian Assurbanipal, in the form Assara Mazaš, though this interpretation is very controversial.

Characteristics
Even though it is speculated that Ahura Mazda was a spirit in the Indo-Iranian religion, he had not yet been given the title of "uncreated spirit". This title was given by Zoroaster, who proclaimed Ahura Mazda as the uncreated spirit, wholly wise, benevolent, and sound, as well as the creator and upholder of Asha.

Zoroaster's revelation
According to Zoroastrian tradition, at the age of 30, Zoroaster received a revelation: while fetching water at dawn for a sacred ritual, he saw the shining figure of the Amesha Spenta, Vohu Manah, who led Zoroaster to the presence of Ahura Mazda, where he was taught the cardinal principles of the "Good Religion" later known as Zoroastrianism. As a result of this vision, Zoroaster felt that he was chosen to spread and preach the religion. He stated that this source of all goodness was the Ahura, worthy of the highest worship. He further stated that Ahura Mazda created spirits known as yazatas to aid him. Zoroaster proclaimed that some Iranian gods were daevas who deserved no worship. These "bad" deities were created by Angra Mainyu, the destructive spirit. Angra Mainyu was the source of all sin and misery in the universe. Zoroaster claimed that Ahura Mazda used the aid of humans in the cosmic struggle against Angra Mainyu. Nonetheless, Ahura Mazda is Angra Mainyu's superior, not his equal. Angra Mainyu and his daevas, which attempt to attract humans away from the Path of Asha, would eventually be defeated.

Plutarch 
According to Plutarch, Zoroaster named "Areimanios" as one of the two rivals who were the artificers of good and evil. In terms of sense perception, Oromazes was to be compared to light, and Areimanios to darkness and ignorance; between these was Mithras the Mediator. Areimanios received offerings that pertained to warding off evil and mourning.

In describing a ritual to Areimanios, Plutarch says the god was invoked as Hades gives the identification as Pluto, the name of the Greek ruler of the underworld used most commonly in texts and inscriptions pertaining to the mystery religions, and in Greek dramatists and philosophers of Athens in the Classical period. Turcan notes that Plutarch makes of Areimanios "a sort of tenebrous Pluto". Plutarch, however, names the Greek god as Hades, not the name Plouton used in the Eleusinian tradition ("The Hidden One") and darkness.

The Areimanios ritual required an otherwise-unknown plant that Plutarch calls "omomi" (Haoma or Soma), which was to be pounded in a mortar and mixed with the blood of a sacrificed wolf. The substance was then carried to a place "where the sun never shines" and cast therein. He adds that "water-rats" belong to this god, and therefore proficient rat-killers are fortunate men.

Plutarch then gives a cosmogonical myth:
Oromazes, born from the purest light, and Areimanius, born from darkness, are constantly at war with each other; and Oromazes created six gods, the first of Good Thought, the second of Truth, the third of Order, and, of the rest, one of Wisdom, one of Wealth, and one the Artificer of Pleasure in what is Honourable. But Areimanius created rivals, as it were, equal to these in number. Then Oromazes enlarged himself to thrice his former size, and removed himself as far distant from the Sun as the Sun is distant from the Earth, and adorned the heavens with stars. One star he set there before all others as a guardian and watchman, the Dog-star. Twenty-four other gods he created and placed in an egg. But those created by Areimanius, who were equal in number to the others, pierced through the egg and made their way inside; hence evils are now combined with good. But a destined time shall come when it is decreed that Areimanius, engaged in bringing on pestilence and famine, shall by these be utterly annihilated and shall disappear; and then shall the earth become a level plain, and there shall be one manner of life and one form of government for a blessed people who shall all speak one tongue. — Plutarch available online: 

Scholar Mary Boyce asserted that the passage shows a "fairly accurate" knowledge of basic Zoroastrianism.

In his Life of Themistocles, Plutarch has the Persian king invoke Areimanios by name, asking the god to cause the king's enemies to behave in such a way as to drive away their own best men; de Jong (1997) doubted that a Persian king would pray to his own national religion's god of evil, particularly in public.

According to Plutarch, the king then made a sacrifice and got drunk – essentially a running gag on Persian kings in Plutarch's writing, and thus dubious evidence for actual behavior.

History

Achaemenid Empire

Whether the Achaemenids were Zoroastrians is a matter of much debate. However, it is known that the Achaemenids were worshipers of Ahura Mazda. The representation and invocation of Ahura Mazda can be seen on royal inscriptions written by Achaemenid kings. The most notable of all the inscriptions is the Behistun Inscription written by Darius I which contains many references to Ahura Mazda. An inscription written in Greek was found in a late Achaemenid temple at Persepolis, which invoked Ahura Mazda and two other deities, Mithra and Anahita. Artaxerxes III makes this invocation Ahuramazda again during his reign.

In the Elamite Persepolis Fortification Tablets dated between 509 - 494 BC, offerings to Ahura Mazda are recorded in tablets #377, #338 (notably alongside Mitra), #339, and #771. 

The early Achaemenid period contained no representation of Ahura Mazda. The winged symbol with a male figure formerly regarded by European scholars as Ahura Mazda has been now speculated to represent the royal xvarənah, the personification of divine power and regal glory. However, it was customary for every emperor from Cyrus until Darius III to have an empty chariot drawn by white horses as a place for Ahura Mazda to accompany the Persian army on battles. The use of images of Ahura Mazda began in the western satraps of the Achaemenid Empire in the late 5th century BC. Under Artaxerxes II, the first literary reference, as well as a statue of Ahura Mazda, was built by a Persian governor of Lydia in 365 BC.

Parthian Empire
It is known that the reverence for Ahura Mazda, as well as Anahita and Mithra, continued with the same traditions during this period. The worship of Ahura Mazda with symbolic images is noticed, but it stopped within the Sassanid period. Zoroastrian iconoclasm, which can be traced to the end of the Parthian period and the beginning of the Sassanid, eventually put an end to the use of all images of Ahura Mazda in worship. However, Ahura Mazda remained symbolized by a dignified male figure, standing or on horseback, which is found in Sassanian investiture.

Sassanid Empire

During the Sassanid Empire, a heretical and divergent form of Zoroastrianism, termed Zurvanism, emerged. It gained adherents throughout the Sassanid Empire, most notably the royal lineage of Sassanian emperors. Under the reign of Shapur I, Zurvanism spread and became a widespread cult. Zurvanism revokes Zoroaster's original message of Ahura Mazda as the uncreated spirit and the "uncreated creator" of all and reduces him to a created spirit, one of two twin sons of Zurvan, their father and the primary spirit. Zurvanism also makes Ahura Mazda and Angra Mainyu of equal strength and only contrasting spirits.

Besides Zurvanism, the Sassanian kings demonstrated their devotion to Ahura Mazda in different fashions. Five kings took the name Hormizd and Bahram II created the title of "Ohrmazd-mowbad" which was continued after the fall of the Sassanid Empire and through the Islamic times. All devotional acts in Zoroastrianism originating from the Sassanian period begin with homage to Ahura Mazda. The five Gāhs start with the declaration in Middle Persian that "Ohrmazd is Lord" and incorporate the Gathic verse "Whom, Mazda hast thou appointed my protector". Zoroastrian prayers are to be said in the presence of light, either in the form of fire or the sun. In the Iranian dialects of Yidḡa and Munǰī, the sun is still called "ormozd".

Present-day Zoroastrianism
In 1884, Martin Haug proposed a new interpretation of Yasna 30.3 that subsequently influenced Zoroastrian doctrine significantly. According to Haug's interpretation, the "twin spirits" of 30.3 were Angra Mainyu and Spenta Mainyu, the former being literally the "Destructive Spirit" and the latter being the "Bounteous Spirit" (of Ahura Mazda). Further, in Haug's scheme, Angra Mainyu was now not Ahura Mazda's binary opposite, but—like Spenta Mainyu—an emanation of Him. Haug also interpreted the concept of a free will of Yasna 45.9 as an accommodation to explain where Angra Mainyu came from since Ahura Mazda created only good. The free will made it possible for Angra Mainyu to choose to be evil. Although these latter conclusions were not substantiated by Zoroastrian tradition, at the time, Haug's interpretation was gratefully accepted by the Parsis of Bombay since it provided a defense against Christian missionary rhetoric, particularly the attacks on the Zoroastrian idea of an uncreated Evil that was as uncreated as God was. Following Haug, the Bombay Parsis began to defend themselves in the English-language press. The argument was that Angra Mainyu was not Mazda's binary opposite but his subordinate, who—as in Zurvanism also—chose to be evil. Consequently, Haug's theories were disseminated as a Parsi interpretation in the West, where they appeared to be corroborating Haug. Reinforcing themselves, Haug's ideas came to be iterated so often that they are today almost universally accepted as doctrine.

In other religions
Some scholars (Kuiper. IIJ I, 1957; Zimmer. Münchner Studien 1984:187–215) believe that Ahura Mazda originates from *vouruna-mitra, or Vedic Varuna (and Mitra). According to William W Malandra both Varuna (in Vedic period) and Ahura Mazda (in old Iranian religion) represented same Indo-Iranian concept of a supreme "wise, all-knowing lord".

In Manichaeism, the name Ohrmazd Bay ("god Ahura Mazda") was used for the primal figure Nāšā Qaḏmāyā, the "original man" and emanation of the Father of Greatness (in Manicheism called Zurvan) through whom after he sacrificed himself to defend the world of light was consumed by the forces of darkness. Although Ormuzd is freed from the world of darkness his "sons", often called his garments or weapons, remain. After a series of events, his sons, later known as the World Soul, will, for the most part, escape from matter and return to the world of light where they came from. Manicheans often identified many of Mani's cosmological figures with Zoroastrian ones. This may partly be because Mani was born in the greatly Zoroastrian Parthian Empire.

In Sogdian Buddhism, Xwrmztʼ (Sogdian was written without a consistent representation of vowels) was the name used in place of Ahura Mazda. Via contacts with Turkic peoples like the Uyghurs, this Sogdian name came to the Mongols, who still name this deity Qormusta Tengri (also Qormusta or Qormusda) is now a popular enough deity to appear in many contexts that are not explicitly Buddhist.

The pre-Christian Armenians had Aramazd as an important deity in their pantheon of gods. He is thought to be a syncretic deity, a combination of the autochthonous Armenian figures Aram and his son Ara and the Iranian Ahura Mazda. In modern-day Armenia, Aramazd is a male first name.

101 Names

 yazat ("Worthy of worship.")
 harvasp-tavãn ("Omnipotent.")
 harvasp-âgâh ("Omniscient.")
 harvasp-h'udhâ ("The Lord of all.")
 abadah ("Without beginning.")
 awî-añjâm ("Without end.")
 bûnastah ("The origin of the formation of the world.")
 frâxtañtah ("Broad end of all.")
 jamakh ("Greatest cause.") 
 parjahtarah ("More exalted.") 
 tum-afayah ("Most innocent.") 
 abravañt ("Apart from everyone.") 
 parvañdah ("Relation with all.") 
 an-ayâfah ("Incomprehensible by anyone.") 
 ham-ayâfah ("Comprehensible of all.") 
 âdharô ("Most straight, most just.") 
 gîrâ ("Holding fast all.") 
 acim ("Without reason.") 
 cimnâ ("Reason of reasons.") 
 safinâ ("Increaser.") 
 âwzâ ("Causer of increase. The Lord of purity") 
 nâshâ ("Reaching all equally.") 
 parvarâ ("Nourisher.") 
 âyânah ("Protector of the world.") 
 âyaîn-âyânah ("Not of various kinds.") 
 an-âyanah ("Without form.") 
 xraoshît-tum ("Firmest.") 
 mînôtum ("Most invisible.") 
 vâsnâ ("Omnipresent.") 
 harvastum ("All in all.") 
 husipâs ("Worthy of thanks.") 
 har-hemît ("All good-natured.") 
 harnekfareh ("All good auspicious-glory.") 
 beshtarnâ ("Remover of affliction.") 
 tarônîs ("The triumphant.") 
 anaoshak ("Immortal.") 
 farashak ("Fulfiller of wishes.") 
 pazohadhad ("Creator of good nature.") 
 xavâpar ("Beneficient.") 
 awaxshâyâ ("Bestower of Love.") 
 awarzâ ("Excessive bringer.”) 
 â-sitôh ("Undefeated, undistressed.") 
 raxôh ("Independent, carefree.") 
 varûn ("Protector from evil.") 
 a-frîpah ("Undeceivable.") 
 awe-frîftah ("Undeceived.") 
 adhvaî ("Unparalleled.") 
 kãme-rat ("Lord of wishes.") 
 framãn-kãm ("Only wish is His command.") 
 âyextan ("Without body.") 
 â-framôsh ("Unforgetful.") 
 hamârnâ ("Taker of accounts.") 
 snâyâ ("Recognizable, worth recognition.") 
 a-tars ("Fearless.") 
 a-bîsh ("Without affliction or torment.") 
 a-frâzdum ("Most exalted.") 
 hamcûn ("Always uniform.") 
 mînô-stîgar ("Creator of the Universe spiritually.") 
 a-mînôgar ("Creator of much spirituality.") 
 mînô-nahab ("Hidden in Spirits.") 
 âdhar-bâtgar ("Air of fire, i.e. transformer into air.") 
 âdhar-namgar ("Water of fire, i.e. transformer into water.") 
 bât-âdhargar ("Transformer of air into fire.") 
 bât-namgar ("Transformer of air into water.") 
 bât-gelgar ("Transformer of air into earth.") 
 bât-girdtum ("Transformer of air into girad, i.e. gathered.") 
 âdhar-kîbarît-tum ("Transformer of fire into jewels.") 
 bâtgarjâi ("Who creates air in all places.") 
 âwtum ("Creator of most excessive water.") 
 gel-âdhargar ("Transformer of the earth into fire.") 
 gel-vâdhgar ("Transformer of the earth into air.") 
 gel-namgar ("Transformer of the earth into water.") 
 gargar ("Artisan of artisans.") 
 garôgar ("Bestower of wishes.") 
 garâgar ("Creator of man") 
 garâgargar ("Creator of the entire creation") 
 a-garâgar ("Creator of four elements") 
 a-garâgargar ("Creator of clusters of the stars") 
 a-gûmãn ("Without doubt.") 
 a-jamãn ("Without time.") 
 a-h'uãn ("Without sleep.") 
 âmushthushyâr ("Intelligent.") 
 frashûtanâ ("Eternal protector-increaser.") 
 padhamãnî ("Maintainer of padman, i.e. the golden mean.") 
 pîrôzgar ("Victorious.") 
 h'udhâvañd ("Lord-Master of the Universe.") 
 ahuramazda ("Lord Omniscient.") 
 abarînkuhantavãn ("Of the most exalted rank in the power of maintaining the origin of the creations.") 
 abarîn-nô-tavã ("Of the most exalted rank in the power of rendering the creations anew.") 
 vaspãn ("Attainer to all the creations.") 
 vaspâr ("Bringer of and attainer to all.") 
 h'âwar ("Merciful.") 
 ahû ("Lord of the world.") 
 âwaxsîdâr ("Forgiver.") 
 dâdhâr ("The just creator.") 
 rayomañd ("Full of rae-lustre-splendour.") 
 h'arehmand ("Full of khoreh, i.e. glory.") 
 dâwar ("The just judge.") 
 kerfagar ("Lord of meritorious deeds.") 
 buxtâr ("Redeemer, saviour.") 
 frashôgar ("Restorer through increase of the soul.")

See also

Asura
Varuna
Creator deity
Names of God

Notes

References

Bibliography

Further reading
 
 
 
 
 
 
 
 
 
 
 

Ancient Iranian gods
Names of God in Zoroastrianism
Creator gods
Wisdom gods
Persian words and phrases
God
Iranian gods
Iranian deities
Yazatas